Mandagadde Krishnarao Indira (5 January 1917 – 15 March 1994) was a well-known Indian novelist in the Kannada language. Her works include Phaniyamma, which won various awards. She began writing novels at the age of forty-five. Some of her novels were made into movies.

Early life and education
Indira was born on 5 January 1917 to T. Suryanarayana Rao, a prosperous agriculturist and Banashankaramma in Thirthahalli, in the Kingdom of Mysore of British India. Her native village was Narasimharajapura in Chikmagalur district. 

Her formal education lasted for seven years, before she married at age twelve to M. Krishna Rao. She studied Kannada poetry and also had a good knowledge of Hindi literature. As said in one of her books, Indira met renowned writer Triveni when she was in Mandya. Triveni appreciated her writing skills, which motivated her to write stories and novels, and then publish them in print media. She ventured into writing novels at age 45.

Career
Her first published novel was Tungabhadra, released in 1963. This was followed by Sadananda (1965), Gejje Pooje (1966) and Navaratna (1967). Her most well-known work is however Phaniyamma, which was released in 1976. Phaniyamma is a novel based on the life of a child widow whom Indira knew during her childhood. Indira heard the story when the widow narrated it to Indira's mother. This novel has been a subject matter of discussion in many books related to feminism. Indira has written more than fifty novels. 

Gejje Pooje was made into a film by director Puttanna Kanagal in 1969. Phaniyamma was made into a film by the director Prema Karanth, won many international awards. Indira's other novels made into films are Hoobana (Mutthu ondu Mutthu), Giribale, Musuku and Poorvapara.

Honors and awards
Indira's novels, Tungabhadra, Sadananda, Navaratna and Phaniyamma have won the Kannada Sahitya Akademi awards. This annual award is given to the best Kannada literature of the year. Thejaswini Niranjana has translated Phaniyamma to English, and this translation has won the Sahitya Akademi of India award and more awards. In view of her contribution to literature, an award is constituted in Indira's name and is given to the best women writers.

Novels and Short stories 
 Sadananda
 Tungabhadra
 Gejjepooje
 Phaniyamma
 Giribale
 Madhuvana 
 Mana Tumbida Madadi
 Hennina Akankshe 
 Thaapadinda Thampige
 Bramhachari
 Kaladarshi
 Shantidhama
 Navaratna
 Ambarada Apsare 
 Nagabeku
 Navajeevana
 Pavaada 
 Kalpana Vilasa
 Dashavatara
 Susvagatha
 Baadigege
 Kathegara 
 Abharana
 Mane Kottu Nodi 
 Kanyakumari 
 Rasavaahini
 Naagaveena
 Aathmasakhi 
 Doctor
 Tapovanadalli 
 Chidvilasa 
 Jaathi Kettavalu 
 Sukhaanta
 Yaru Hithavaru
 Hoobana 
 Puttanna Kanagal
 Varnaleele 
 Hasivu
 Bidige Chandrama Donku 
 Koopa 
 Koochu Bhatta
 Jaala
 Gunda
 Musuku
 Kavalu
 Mohanamaale
 Anubhava Kunja 
 Noorondu Baagilu 
 Taggina Mane Seethe
 Poorvapara
 Hamsagana
 Thaalidavaru
 Manomandira
 Vichitra Prema
 Onde Nimisha
 Pournami
 Bhaava Bandhana

Movies based on Indira's novels

Personal life
She died at the age of 77. M K Indira is younger sister of journalist T S Ramachandra Rao, better known as TSR of Choobaana (ಛೂಬಾಣ).

References

Sources

External links
 Dr. Kamat's Article on M.K. Indira

1917 births
1994 deaths
Kannada-language writers
20th-century Indian women writers
People from Shimoga district
Kannada people
Women writers from Karnataka
20th-century Indian novelists
Indian women novelists